Barang Thleak  is a khum (commune) of Phnum Proek District in Battambang Province in north-western Cambodia.

Villages

References

Communes of Battambang province
Phnum Proek District